Maechi or Mae chee are Buddhist monastics in Thailand who have dedicated their life to religion, vowing celibacy, living an ascetic life and taking the Eight or Ten Precepts (i.e., more than the Five Precepts taken by laypersons). They occupy a position similar to sāmaṇerī.

It is still illegal for women to take full ordination as a bhikkhuni (nun) in Thailand because of a 1928 law created by the Supreme Patriarch of Thailand. He based this on the belief that Gautama Buddha allowed senior bhikkhunis to initiate new women into the order. Citing the belief that the Theravada bhikkhuni sangha had died out centuries earlier and the Buddha's rules regarding bhikkhunī ordinations according to the Vinaya, the patriarch commanded that any Thai bhikkhu who ordained a female "is said to conduct what the Buddha has not prescribed, to revoke what the Buddha has laid down, and to be an enemy of the holy Religion...". The most recent case brought to the Supreme Court of Thailand is that of Phothirak, a former monk who has been ejected from the Thai sangha after being convicted of breaching the vinaya repeatedly. Phothirak then created his own sect of Buddhism, Santi Asoke, and ordained about 80 bhikkhunis in 1998, leading to his imprisonment for 66 months on several successive counts of "causing schism amongst the religion".

Maechis have traditionally been and still are marginalized figures in Thai society. During the 20th century, new movements to improve the lot of maechis emerged. But the situation is still far from being acceptable under modern standards of human rights, with other Thai women often the most vocally opposed to women wearing robes. The Thai bhikkhuni order has been revived by Dhammananda Bhikkhuni, who took ordination in a reestablished bhikkhuni lineage in Sri Lanka without being imprisoned as a result. But opposition from high-ranking Thai monks seems to have discouraged maechis from joining her. Since 1971 there has been a Queen's Foundation for Thai Maechi, addressing maechi affairs.

Overview 
Because of the belief that the bhikkhuni order was never established in Thailand, women have traditionally been denied the chance to become ordained members of the sangha. Instead, for several centuries Thai women have chosen to live as maechis, taking the eight precepts and living either in monasteries or in dedicated communities of female renunciants. Temporary maechis, who typically do not shave their heads, are called chi phram.

Like bhikkhus, maechis shave their heads and undertake precepts not generally observed by lay followers. Maechis most commonly receive these precepts from a monk, but there is little in the way of a formal ordination ceremony. Maechis wear white robes in their daily lives, distinguishing them from both monks and other lay people. Maechi are not recognized as monastics by the Thai government and are not eligible for monastic benefits, but they are denied the rights of other lay citizens. While the officially recognized (male) sangha has traditionally received considerable oversight and assistance from various government ministries, only in the 20th century did the Thai Sangha begin to take an organized role in providing for the needs of maechis. An institute now attempts to roughly track the number of maechis in the country, and provides funds that can be used for educational opportunities for maechis. The amount per person spent by the government on supporting maechis, is significantly less than the amount spent on monks. Likewise, maechis do not receive certain perks (such as free passage on public transportation) that are offered to monks. Yet, maechis, like monks, are forbidden from voting or standing for civil elections in Thailand. Maechis have traditionally not enjoyed the same level of support given to monks by the Thai laity. Because the maechis have no special position described in the Tipiṭaka or Pāli Canon, they are seen as laywomen and gifts given to maechis are not seen as bringing merit to the donor in the same manner that gifts given to a monk would. Most Thais are unfamiliar with the history of the Theravada bhikkhuni sangha and believe that Gautama Buddha never ordained women. Others believe that women become maechis because they can't find a husband or to escape personal and family problems.

Most maechis live on temple grounds. The temple may provide daily meals and lodging but, in general, maechis are expected to provide for themselves through support from relatives and temples do not care for them as they do male monastics. Most maechis essentially act as servants or staff for the temple, cooking and cleaning for monks and overseeing the sale of incense and other offerings to visitors to the temple.

Smaller numbers of maechis live in their own communities, which may or may not be associated with a local monastery. Women in these communities often experience better conditions than those living in traditional monasteries. The separation of the male and female renunciants helps discourage the maechis being used as servants by monks and temple staff.

History 
The exact derivation of the term maechi is not known. Several possible etymologies have been suggested, relating maechi either to Sanskrit or Sinhalese terms for renunciants, morality, or other positive qualities. The word chi is occasionally used in the Thai language to refer either to Buddhist monks, or to ordained followers of other traditions, such as Hindu priests or Jain monastics.

Historically, little is known about the status and lives of maechis prior to Western contact with the kingdoms that preceded the modern state of Thailand. European observers in the 17th century reported seeing white-robed, shaven-headed women who lived on the grounds of Buddhist temples. Most of these women were reported to be advanced in years, possibly indicating that life as a maechi may have served as a sort of retirement plan for older women who did not have families to provide for them. Records from prior to this time do not explicitly mention maechis in Thailand; it is likely that some records were lost in the destruction of the Ayutthaya Kingdom in the 18th century. The marginalization of the maechis in Thai society may also play a role in their exclusion from the historical record.

In 1969, the first nationwide meeting of maechis was organized by the Supreme Patriarch of Thailand. During the same year, the Queen's Foundation for Thai Maechi was formed to organize maechis scattered throughout Thailand.  The institute seeks to improve conditions for maechis by providing better access to education, and screening and placing potential maechis and seeks to ensure that all maechis possess basic knowledge of Buddhist teachings and proper monastic behavior. The institute has also attempted to discourage maechi from begging for alms as monks do. Instead, older maechis (who are particularly at risk for poverty) are increasingly placed in old-age homes.

Other female Buddhist orders in Thailand 
Despite the absence of a full bhikkhuni ordination in Thailand, a number of other groups of female renunciants emerged in Thai society during the 20th Century. The buddhasavikas are a very small organization of women who have received ordination from  Taiwanese Buddhist lineages such as Fo Guang Shan. The sikhamats were female renunciants ordained by the Santi Asoke movement. They lived a communal life, kept a strict vegetarian diet, and attempted to be self-supporting through organic farming and daily manual labor.

See also 
 Anagarika
 Dasa sil mata, literally "10 precept mother": female lay renunciants in Sri Lanka.
 Thilashin – Literally 'possessor of moral integrity'. Female lay renunciants in Myanmar. A branch of this lineage was also brought to Nepal in the 1930s.
 Siladharas – Order of Theravadin monastics at Amaravati Buddhist Monastery, UK. They follow the basic 10 precepts plus a selection of rules from the bhikkhuni pātimokkha
Kappiya - Buddhist lay manciple who resides in a monastery (vihāra) and assists Buddhist monks.
 Donchee (Cambodia)
 Maechi (Thailand)
 Upāsaka and Upāsikā (Buddhist laity)
 Chandra Khonnokyoong

References

Further reading 

 
 

 
Buddhism in Thailand
Ordination of women in Buddhism
Buddhist monasticism
Thai Buddhist titles
Buddhist religious occupations
Theravada